Emran Barakzai (born 29 November 1994) is an Afghan-Dutch football player who plays for DVVA.

Club career
Barakzai joined the Ajax Youth Academy in 2007, after having been scouted from partner club FC Omniworld from nearby Almere. Moving up the ranks, Barakzai joined the reserves team Jong Ajax during the 2013/14 season. Sidelined by an injury for a majority of the season, he struggled to find his place back in the team under head coach Alfons Groenendijk, Barakzai made his professional debut in an Eerste Divisie match against FC Volendam on 11 April 2014. The North Holland derby match between the two sides, saw Barakzai come on in the 84'-minute for Sheraldo Becker. The match ended in a 1–0 loss for the reserves team. In March 2014 it was announced that Ajax would not extend his contract leaving him to find a new club during the transfer window, with Heracles Almelo, Go Ahead Eagles and RKC Waalwijk mentioned amongst the possible new clubs.

In 2015 Barakzai joined amateur club VV Hoogland, competing in the Eerste Klasse for the second half of the 2014/15 season, while pursuing his studies in Biomedical Science at the VU University Medical Center in Amsterdam.

On 9 June 2015 it was announced that Barakzai had signed with DVS '33 from Ermelo, competing in the Topklasse, the third tier of professional football in the Netherlands. He was assigned the number 24 shirt. The following season, he joined VV Bennekom competing in the Dutch Eerste Klasse.

In July 2017, Barakzai joined DTS Oudkarspel.

International career
Barakzai holds both Dutch and Afghan passports and is still eligible to represent either on International level.

Career statistics

Club performance

Statistics accurate as of last match played on 11 April 2014.

1 Includes UEFA Champions League and UEFA Europa League matches.

2 Includes Johan Cruijff Shield matches.

References 

1994 births
Living people
Footballers from Kabul
Afghan men's footballers
Dutch footballers
Afghan emigrants to the Netherlands
Afghan expatriate sportspeople in the Netherlands
Dutch people of Pashtun descent
Association football midfielders
Jong Ajax players
Eerste Divisie players
Derde Divisie players
VV Hoogland players
DVS '33 players